Lurk (Chinese: 潜伏) is a 2009 Chinese television series based on Long Yi's spy novel of the same name.

Synopsis 
The story takes place after 1946, after the WWII Japanese surrender and a Chinese civil war breaks out.

An underground worker for the Communist Party, Yu Zecheng (Sun Honglei), is an undetected spy within the Kuomintang (KMT) secret service. He has to keep his distance from his true love, Zuo Lan, in order to conceal his real identity and agrees to marry Wang Cuiping (Yao Chen), a quick-tempered but straightforward guerrilla fighter from the countryside. The two collaborate closely to help their organization obtain important information from the KMT that's valuable to the Communist Party. Despite their marriage's false beginning, they eventually grow to love each other.

With Liberation Day impending, Cuiping, threatened by exposure of his secret identity, is asked to be transported somewhere else for security reasons, leaving Yu. When Yu is also about to leave, after successfully obtaining a crucial name list, he is taken away by the KMT secret police on a secret service assignment to Taiwan, where he has to spend the rest of his life, lurking.

Cast
Sun Honglei as Yu Zecheng
Yao Chen as Wang Cuiping
Shen Aojun 沈傲君 as Zuo Lan
Zu Feng as Li Ya
Feng Enhe 冯恩鹤 as Wu Jingzhong
Wu Gang 吴刚 as Lu Qiaoshan
Fan Yulin 范雨林 as Ma Kui
Wang Xiaoyi 王小毅 as Liao Sanmin
Zhu Jie 朱杰 as Mu Wanqiu
Cao Bingkun 曹炳琨 as Xie Ruolin
Ma Junqin 马军勤 as Mrs. Wu
Liu Changwei 刘昌伟 as Manager Qiu
Lu Yu 陆羽 as Manager Luo
Shi Wenzhong 石文忠 as Li Haifeng
Sun Lan 孙岚 as Xu Baofeng
Xu Jingling 徐婧灵 as Mrs. Ma
Bian Tao 卞涛 as Lv Zongfang
Zhang Guoqing 张国庆 as Mu Liancheng
Zhou Bowen 周博文 as Long Er
Liu Yanyu 刘言语 as Secretary Hong
Cui Song 崔嵩 as Wang Zhanjing
Yao Gang 姚刚 as Dai Li
He Bo 何波 as Zhou Yafu
Ji Shi Guang 吉世光 as Sheng Xiang
Ren Xue Hai 任雪海 as Mr. Ye
Xu Tao 徐涛 as narrator

Reception
Lurk was a critical and commercial hit. Viewers praised  its storyline and character development, and consider the show a departure from other spy stories seen on Chinese television and movies. The series was rated highly, and was called "a milestone in Chinese television productions".

Awards and nominations

Lurk Spy Museum 
A museum has been established in Tianjin, where the script was based on. In Da Li Dao 57, guests are welcome to come and see Wang Tian Mu's old residence, which is now a private owned museum as well as a restaurant. Many of the objects used in the TV series can be seen there, and it is possible to have Tianjins local historian to come and talk about the house, the area and the city. Some of the scenes in the TV series were also taken in this place.

References

External links
 Lurk Official Website

Chinese period television series
Chinese espionage television series
2009 Chinese television series debuts
Television shows based on Chinese novels
Television shows set in Tianjin